Marcela Kubalčíková (born April 23, 1973 in Zlín) is a retired female backstroke and butterfly swimmer from the Czech Republic, who competed for her native country at the 1996 Olympic Games in Atlanta, Georgia.

References
 sports-reference

1973 births
Living people
Czech female swimmers
Female backstroke swimmers
Female butterfly swimmers
Swimmers at the 1996 Summer Olympics
Olympic swimmers of the Czech Republic
Sportspeople from Zlín